The 1954 Iowa State Cyclones football team represented Iowa State College of Agricultural and Mechanic Arts (later renamed Iowa State University) in the Big Seven Conference during the 1954 college football season. In their first year under head coach Vince DiFrancesca, the Cyclones compiled a 3–6 record (1–5 against conference opponents), finished in sixth place in the conference, and were outscored by their opponents by a combined total of 182 to 151. They played their home games at Clyde Williams Field in Ames, Iowa.

The team's regular starting lineup on offense consisted of left end Mel Wostoupal, left tackle Ralph Brown, left guard Herb McDermott, center Elmer May, right guard Weldon Thalacker, right tackle Jim McMaulley, right end Barney Alleman, quarterback Jerry Finley, left halfback Gary Lutz, right halfback Bruce Alexander, and fullback Max Burkett. Max Burkett and Weldon Thalacker were the team captains.

The team's statistical leaders included Max Burkett with 528 rushing yards and 30 points (five touchdowns), John Breckenridge with 236 passing yards, and Mel Wostoupal with 151 receiving yards. No Iowa State players were selected as first-team all-conference players.

The November road game at Kansas State marked the first time that the Cyclones flew to a road contest.

Schedule

References

Iowa State
Iowa State Cyclones football seasons
Iowa State Cyclones football